Lehavot Haviva is a kibbutz in northern Israel. Located in the eastern Sharon plain near the Green Line, it falls under the jurisdiction of Menashe Regional Council.

History
The kibbutz was established on 20 October 1949 by members of Hashomer Hatzair who had immigrated from Czechoslovakia. It was named for Haviva Reik. In 1951 it moved three kilometres east to its present location onto land that had belonged to the depopulated Palestinian Arab village of al-Jalama. Sde Yitzhak was founded on the former site of Lehavot Haviva the following year.

References

External links
 

Czech-Jewish culture in Israel
Czechoslovak Jews
Kibbutzim
Kibbutz Movement
Populated places established in 1949
Populated places in Haifa District
Slovak-Jewish culture in Israel
1949 establishments in Israel